Mount Vang is an isolated mountain standing southward of George VI Sound and 80 miles east-southeast of Eklund Islands in southern Palmer Land. It was discovered by Finn Ronne and Carl Eklund of the US Antarctic Service (USAS), 1939–41, during their sledge journey through George VI Sound, and resighted from the air on a flight of December 3, 1947 by the Ronne Antarctic Research Expedition (RARE) under Ronne.

Mount Vang was named by Ronne for Knut Vang of Brooklyn, NY, who contributed photographic materials to the RARE 1947–48.

Mountains of Palmer Land